Naadan Pennu is a 1967 Indian Malayalam-language film, directed by K. S. Sethumadhavan and produced by M. O. Joseph. The film stars Prem Nazir, Sathyan, Sheela and Jayabharathi. Later this movie is remade in Telugu as Premajeevulu. Superstar Krishna, Kanta rao and rajasri acted in Telugu movie. The film had musical score by G. Devarajan.

Cast

Prem Nazir as Babu
Sathyan as Chacko
Sheela as Achamma
Jayabharathi as Sainaba
Adoor Bhasi as Ummukka
Thikkurissy Sukumaran Nair as Babu's father
T. S. Muthaiah as Mathai
Bahadoor as Antappan
Meena as Saramma
N. Govindankutty as Priest
S. P. Pillai as Aliyaar
Paul Vengola as Appu
P. R. Menon

Soundtrack
The music was composed by G. Devarajan and the lyrics were written by Vayalar Ramavarma.

References

External links
 

1967 films
1960s Malayalam-language films
Films directed by K. S. Sethumadhavan